Neopachycormus is an extinct genus of prehistoric bony fish that lived during the Cenomanian.

See also

 Prehistoric fish
 List of prehistoric bony fish

References

External links
 

Pachycormiformes
Late Cretaceous fish
Cretaceous animals of Asia
Prehistoric bony fish genera